Cleethorpes railway station is a terminal railway station serving the seaside town of Cleethorpes in North East Lincolnshire, England. The station is managed by TransPennine Express, with East Midlands Railway and Northern services also using the station.

History
The station opened on Easter Monday, 6 April 1863 when the Manchester, Sheffield and Lincolnshire Railway extended the line from Grimsby into the town.

The station buildings were constructed in 1884 with refreshment rooms and a clocktower by John Mann Lockerbie and Arthur Wilkinson of Birmingham. Prince Albert Victor, Duke of Clarence and Avondale used the station on 2 July 1885 when he visited Cleethorpes to open the promenade and gardens facing the sea constructed by H.B James CE of Westminster for the railway company.

The station layout was remodelled in 1889 to give six platforms and two carriage sidings extending in the direction of Grimsby. By 1891 the carriage sidings had been increased to six and extended to a new signal box at Suggitt's Lane. This layout also included a turntable to the rear of the signal box. A 1910 report into work carried out the previous year refers to new crossovers to enable trains to arrive and depart from any platform. The signal box by this time had 100 levers and was jointly the third largest on the Great Central system with Marylebone.  The original GCR station buildings on platform one were replaced by the current single storey structure on 14 July 1961, but they still stand and are now used as train crew accommodation.

Until 1985 the station and surrounding area was still controlled by a mechanical signal box with full semaphore signalling, including double track throughout to Grimsby and beyond. However, a resignalling scheme for the entire area saw the line to Grimsby singled & the number of platforms reduced to four (numbers 1–3 and 5). Platform 5 was renumbered 4 and the Diesel Fuelling Road is what used to be platform 6. The signal box was closed & demolished and new colour light signals installed which were operated from a panel in the signal box at Pasture Street in Grimsby. In later works the platform surfaces have been rebuilt to modern specifications. Since January 2016, all signalling here is supervised from the Rail Operating Centre at York.

In the 1970s Cleethorpes had a twice daily return service to London King's Cross, typically hauled by a Class 55 Deltic.

Even after resignalling until the withdrawal of locomotive hauled cross-Pennine services and the through London King's Cross service, evening time at Cleethorpes was a very busy time with most arrivals requiring cleaning through the carriage washer, fuelling on the small fuel point and shunting into the various departure positions for the following morning. Locomotives returned to the diesel depot at Immingham for overnight servicing, and the High Speed Train from King's Cross was fuelled at the fuelling point at the rear of what used to be called Hawkeys Cafe via a siding that went round the back of the Wash Plant control building and joined up with the old Platform 6 road.

The station building on platform 1 was deemed unsafe and closed in 2001, leaving only platforms 2 and 3 in use. Platform 1 had reopened by 2007, and all platforms were fitted with new information displays. Other platforms at the station remain unused, and are in a state of neglect as sand has blown from the nearby beach onto the lines and formed drifts. Platform 1 is normally used by TransPennine Express services to Liverpool Lime Street, platform 2 for EMR services to Barton-on-Humber, whilst platform 3 is usually used only for early morning and late evening TransPennine Express services, and the Northern Saturday-only service to  via  and Retford.

First TransPennine Express built a small depot, to provide stabling, light maintenance and re-fuelling at Cleethorpes for its DMU fleet. The Class 153 units used by both East Midlands Railway and Northern do not berth here overnight but work in and out either in service or empty from Lincoln.

Facilities
The station is fully staffed, with the ticket office open 06:45-19:30 Mondays to Saturdays and 09:00-19:30 on Sundays. A self-service ticket machine is provided on the concourse for use outside these times and for collecting pre-paid tickets. There are toilets, a waiting room and refreshment facilities (a public house) also located on the concourse. Customer help points, timetable posters and CIS displays are located on both the concourse and each platform.  All platforms have step-free access.

The station has the PlusBus scheme where train and bus tickets can be bought together at a saving, it is in the same area as Grimsby Docks, New Clee and Grimsby stations.

Services
Services at Cleethorpes are operated by TransPennine Express, East Midlands Railway and Northern Trains.

Typical off-peak services are as follows:
 TransPennine Express
TransPennine Express operate an hourly service to  via ,  and  along their South TransPennine route via the South Humberside Main Line, the Hope Valley Line and the Styal Line. On Sundays, the service is two-hourly in the morning but improves to hourly in the afternoon.
 East Midlands Railway
On Sundays, there are three trains per day to Nottingham and four to Barton-on-Humber during the summer months with this service expected to run in the winter for the first time.
 Northern Trains
Northern Trains operate a limited service of three trains per day to  via  which operate on Saturdays only.

Proposed Changes
In January 2021, the Department for Transport opened a consultation on proposals to improve services around Manchester and improve reliability with the options proposed by the Manchester Recovery Taskforce. Options B and C proposed the Manchester Airport to Cleethorpes service be diverted to  via  instead of running to the airport, providing a direct link to Liverpool and Warrington. If either of these options are chosen, the changes would come into force in May 2022. In October 2021, a preferred option, Option B+ was announced and it involved the new Liverpool to Cleethorpes service replacing the Manchester Airport service, if proposals are agreed they would come in to force from December 2022.

References

Notes

Bibliography
 "Signal Box Diagrams No.14 – Cleethorpes" by Roger Milnes and John Bennett, Forward, the journal of the Great Central Railway Society, No. 83, August 1991. 
 Body, G. (1986), PSL Field Guides - Railways of the Eastern Region, Volume 1, Patrick Stephens Ltd, Wellingborough,

External links

 Photos of Cleethorpes Station & Approaches in the 1980s

Railway stations in the Borough of North East Lincolnshire
DfT Category D stations
Former Great Central Railway stations
Railway stations in Great Britain opened in 1863
Railway stations served by East Midlands Railway
Northern franchise railway stations
Railway stations served by TransPennine Express
Cleethorpes
Grade II listed buildings in Lincolnshire